{{Infobox person
| name               = Casey Treat
| image              = 
| image_size         = 250px
| alt                = 
| caption            = 
| birth_name         = 
| birth_date         = 
| birth_place        = Seattle, Washington, U.S.
| death_date         = 
| death_place        = 
| occupation         = pastor, televangelist, author
| years_active       = 1978-present
| known_for          =  Co-Founder and pastor, Christian Faith Center, Seattle, WA  President of Vision College (formally Dominion College)  Co-host, Your Unlimited Life TV program with wife Wendy
| nationality        = American
| title              = Casey Treat
| education          = Seattle Bible College, B.A. (theology), 1980  Hansei University D.Th. (honorary), 2009
| spouse             = Wendy Peterson, 1978–present
| children           = 2 sons, Caleb and Micah, 1 daughter, Tasha
| website            = http://www.caseytreat.com/
}}

Casey Treat (born May 11, 1955) is an American pastor, televangelist, author and motivational speaker. He is the co-founder and co-pastor of Christian Faith Center in Federal Way, Washington. He hosts his own television program called Your Unlimited Life, which can be seen on the internet and on various Christian TV networks such as Daystar TV and the Trinity Broadcasting Network (TBN).

Early life and education
As a teenager growing up in Seattle, Treat was heavily involved with drugs and alcohol. In 1974, at the age of 19, he entered a drug rehab center. During his time there, he became born again and began to learn how to "renew his mind" through the Bible, which he had accepted as the word of God. Treat then received his bachelor of theology from Seattle Bible College, and married Wendy Peterson whom he met in college  in 1978. In 2009, Treat received an honorary doctorate degree from Hansei University in Seoul, South Korea (through Dr. David Yonggi Cho and Dr. Kim Sunghae Cho), recognizing his accomplishments in the ministry for nearly 30 years.

Ministry

Christian Faith Center
In 1980, the Treats, while still attending bible college, founded Christian Faith Center in Seattle, which initially met in a gymnasium foyer of Seattle Christian School.

Family/Personal life
Treat resides in the Seattle area with his wife, Wendy. They have three grown children, Caleb, Tasha and Micah.

Controversy 
In 2017 Caleb Treat, Casey's son and executive pastor of Christian Faith Center, was sued over claims of sexual harassment. The case settled for an undisclosed sum of money.

Caleb, his wife Christa, and their 2 daughters moved to Birmingham, Alabama to be a part of Church of the Highlands in 2017 weeks after their 2nd child was born.

In December 2018, a second lawsuit was filed against the Treats and the church, alleged sexual exploitation, abuse, and financial improprieties.

According to a Reddit post in August of 2021, a user accused Caleb of coercion into a sexual encounter during his time at Church of the Highlands. They allege that Caleb had a Tinder profile in 2017 and invited them to his apartment in Birmingham when no one else was home. He claimed he was “a virgin” and the situation “escalated into sex”. The user further alleges they “felt uncomfortable the entire time” and that the apartment was “fully funded by Chris Hodges” (pastor of Church of the Highlands).

See also
Prosperity Theology
Glossolalia
Faith Healing
Pentecostalism
Jesus Christ
Christianity

References

External links
 Casey Treat and Christian Faith Center Official website

1955 births
People from Seattle
American evangelists
American motivational speakers
Writers from Seattle
Living people